Sirajganj-4 is a constituency represented in the Jatiya Sangsad (National Parliament) of Bangladesh since 2014 by Tanveer Imam of the Awami League.

Boundaries
Sirajganj-4 constituency consists of Ullahpara Upazila of Sirajganj district.

Members of Parliament

References

External links
 

Parliamentary constituencies in Bangladesh
Sirajganj District